Carinoturris is a genus of sea snails, marine gastropod mollusks in the family Pseudomelatomidae, the turrids.

Species
Species within the genus Carinoturris include:
 Carinoturris adrastia (Dall, 1919)
 Carinoturris fortis Bartsch, 1944
 Carinoturris polycaste (Dall, 1919)
Species brought into synonymy
 Carinoturris adestia Dall, 1919: synonym of  Carinoturris adrastia (Dall, 1919)

References

External links
  Bartsch, P, Some turrid mollusks of Monterey Bay and vicinity; Proceedings of the Biological Society of Washington, v. 57 p. 57-68
 
 Bouchet, P.; Kantor, Y. I.; Sysoev, A.; Puillandre, N. (2011). A new operational classification of the Conoidea (Gastropoda). Journal of Molluscan Studies. 77(3): 273-308
 Worldwide Mollusc Species Data Base: Pseudomelatomidae

 
Pseudomelatomidae
Gastropod genera